The 2003 New York Mets season was the 42nd regular season for the Mets. They went 66-95 and finished 5th in the NL East. They were managed by Art Howe. They played home games at Shea Stadium.

Offseason
November 25, 2002: Jorge Velandia was signed as a free agent with the New York Mets.
December 5, 2002: Tom Glavine was signed as a free agent with the New York Mets.
December 19, 2002: Mike Stanton was signed as a free agent with the New York Mets.
January 11, 2003: Tsuyoshi Shinjo was signed as a free agent with the New York Mets.
February 11, 2003: Jay Bell signed as a free agent with the New York Mets.
February 13, 2003: David Cone signed as a free agent with the New York Mets.

Regular season
After their disappointing 2002 season the Mets entered 2003 hoping to contend for a playoff spot. But the season ended up being a massive disappointment as they were defeated by the Cubs at home 15-2 on opening day and finished just 66-95.

Opening Day starters
Roberto Alomar
Jeromy Burnitz
Roger Cedeño
Cliff Floyd
Tom Glavine
Mike Piazza
Rey Sanchez
Mo Vaughn
Ty Wigginton

Detailed record

Season standings

National League East

Record vs. opponents

Notable transactions
 July 1, 2003: Roberto Alomar was traded by the New York Mets with cash to the Chicago White Sox for Edwin Almonte, Royce Ring, and Andrew Salvo.
 July 16, 2003: Armando Benítez was traded by the New York Mets to the New York Yankees for Ryan Bicondoa, Jason Anderson and Anderson Garcia.
 July 29, 2003: Kenny Kelly was traded by the Seattle Mariners to the New York Mets for Rey Sánchez and cash.

Game log

Regular season

|- bgcolor="ffcccc"
| 1 || March 31 || Cubs || 2–15 || Wood (1–0) || Glavine (0–1) || — || Shea Stadium || 53,586 || 0–1
|-

|- bgcolor="ccffcc"
| 2 || April 2 || Cubs || 4–1 || Leiter (1–0) || Clement (0–1) || Benitez (1) || Shea Stadium || 20,594 || 1–1
|- bgcolor="ffcccc"
| 3 || April 3 || Cubs || 3–6 || Prior (1–0) || Trachsel (0–1) || — || Shea Stadium || 17,244 || 1–2
|- bgcolor="ccffcc"
| 4 || April 4 || Expos || 4–0 || Cone (1–0) || Ohka (0–1) || — || Shea Stadium || 18,040 || 2–2
|- bgcolor="ccffcc"
| 5 || April 5 || Expos || 3–1 || Glavine (1–1) || Armas (1–1) || Benitez (2) || Shea Stadium || 36,817 || 3–2
|- bgcolor="ffcccc"
| 6 || April 6 || Expos || 5–8 || Stewart (1–0) || Benitez (0–1) || Biddle (2) || Shea Stadium || 35,093 || 3–3
|- bgcolor="ccffcc"
| 7 || April 8 || @ Marlins || 4–2 || Leiter (2–0) || Redman (1–1) || Benitez (3) || Pro Player Stadium || 10,103 || 4–3
|- bgcolor="ffcccc"
| 8 || April 9 || @ Marlins || 2–3 || Looper (1–0) || Stanton (0–1) || — || Pro Player Stadium || 10,052 || 4–4
|- bgcolor="ffcccc"
| 9 || April 10 || @ Marlins || 3–4 || Spooneybarger (1–0) || Benitez (0–2) || — || Pro Player Stadium || 10,267 || 4–5
|- bgcolor="ffcccc"
| 10 || April 11 || @ Expos || 0–10 || Ohka (1–1) || Cone (1–1) || — || Hiram Bithorn Stadium || 17,906 || 4–6
|- bgcolor="ffcccc"
| 11 || April 12 || @ Expos || 4–5 || Hernandez (1–0) || Seo (0–1) || Biddle (3) || Hiram Bithorn Stadium || 18,264 || 4–7
|- bgcolor="ffcccc"
| 12 || April 13 || @ Expos || 1–2  || Biddle (1–0) || Stanton (0–2) || — || Hiram Bithorn Stadium || 16,332 || 4–8
|- bgcolor="ffcccc"
| 13 || April 14 || @ Expos || 3–5 || Smith (1–0) || Strickland (0–1) || Biddle (4) || Hiram Bithorn Stadium || 13,155 || 4–9
|- bgcolor="ccffcc"
| 14 || April 15 || @ Pirates || 3–1 || Glavine (2–1) || Fogg (1–2) || Benitez (4) || PNC Park || 14,728 || 5–9
|- bgcolor="ffcccc"
| 15 || April 16 || @ Pirates || 3–6 || Suppan (3–0) || Cone (1–2) || — || PNC Park || 12,609 || 5–10
|- bgcolor="ccffcc"
| 16 || April 17 || @ Pirates || 7–2 || Seo (1–1) || D'Amico (1–2) || — || PNC Park || 11,299 || 6–10
|- bgcolor="ccffcc"
| 17 || April 18 || Marlins || 6–3 || Weathers (1–0) || Nunez (0–2) || Benitez (5) || Shea Stadium || 18,525 || 7–10 
|- bgcolor="ffcccc"
| 18 || April 19 || Marlins || 5–6 || Looper (2–0) || Benitez (0–3) || — || Shea Stadium || 36,448 || 7–11
|- bgcolor="ccffcc"
| 19 || April 20 || Marlins || 7–4 || Glavine (3–1) || Nunez (0–3) || — || Shea Stadium || 26,245 || 8–11
|- bgcolor="ffcccc"
| 20 || April 22 || Astros || 2–6 || Redding (1–2) || Cone (1–3) || — || Shea Stadium || 31,733 || 8–12
|- bgcolor="ccffcc"
| 21 || April 23 || Astros || 4–2 || Leiter (3–0) || Oswalt (2–2) || Benitez (6) || Shea Stadium || 20,322 || 9–12
|- bgcolor="ccffcc"
| 22 || April 24 || Astros || 7–4 || Astacio (1–0) || Miller (0–2) || Benitez (7) || Shea Stadium || 31,656 || 10–12
|- bgcolor="ccffcc"
| 23 || April 25 || Diamondbacks || 4–3 || Stanton (1–2) || Villarreal (1–1) || Benitez (8) || Shea Stadium || 24,725 || 11–12
|- bgcolor="cccccc"
| – || April 26 || Diamondbacks || colspan=8|Postponed (rain); rescheduled for April 27
|- bgcolor="ffcccc"
| 24 || April 27  || Diamondbacks || 1–6 || Webb (1–0) || Glavine (3–2) || — || Shea Stadium || N/A || 11–13
|- bgcolor="ffcccc"
| 25 || April 27  || Diamondbacks || 3–7 || Johnson (1–2) || Seo (1–2) || Mantei (3) || Shea Stadium || 36,491 || 11–14
|- bgcolor="ffcccc"
| 26 || April 29 || @ Cardinals || 3–13 || Morris (2–2) || Leiter (3–1) || — || Busch Stadium || 30,275 || 11–15
|- bgcolor="ffcccc"
| 27 || April 30 || @ Cardinals || 4–13 || Williams (4–0) || Astacio (1–1) || — || Busch Stadium || 30,265 || 11–16
|-

|- bgcolor="ffcccc"
| 28 || May 1 || @ Cardinals || 5–6  || Eldred (2–0) || Strickland (0–2) || — || Busch Stadium || 35,283 || 11–17
|- bgcolor="ccffcc"
| 29 || May 2 || @ Brewers || 9–3 || Glavine (4–2) || Rusch (1–5) || — || Miller Park || 16,315 || 12–17
|- bgcolor="ffcccc"
| 30 || May 3 || @ Brewers || 2–3 || Foster (2–0) || Weathers (1–1) || DeJean (5) || Miller Park || 19,796 || 12–18
|- bgcolor="ccffcc"
| 31 || May 4 || @ Brewers || 5–3 || Leiter (4–1) || Kinney (2–2) || Benitez (9) || Miller Park || 18,571 || 13–18
|- bgcolor="ccffcc"
| 32 || May 6 || Dodgers || 3–2 || Astacio (2–1) || Perez (1–2) || Benitez (10) || Shea Stadium || 21,173 || 14–18
|- bgcolor="ffcccc"
| 33 || May 7 || Dodgers || 1–2 || Nomo (4–4) || Trachsel (0–2) || Gagne (11) || Shea Stadium || 18,965 || 14–19
|- bgcolor="ffcccc"
| 34 || May 8 || Dodgers || 1–6 || Ishii (3–1) || Glavine (4–3) || — || Shea Stadium || 18,729 || 14–20
|- bgcolor="ffcccc"
| 35 || May 9 || Padres || 4–5 || Hackman (1–0) || Weathers (1–2) || Orosco (2) || Shea Stadium || 29,855 || 14–21
|- bgcolor="ccffcc"
| 36 || May 10 || Padres || 4–2  || Stanton (2–2) || Wright (1–5) || — || Shea Stadium || 32,930 || 15–21
|- bgcolor="ccffcc"
| 37 || May 11 || Padres || 3–2 || Lloyd (1–0) || Matthews (1–1) || Benitez (11) || Shea Stadium || 30,694 || 16–21
|- bgcolor="ccffcc"
| 38 || May 12 || @ Rockies || 9–6 || Trachsel (1–2) || Young (0–1) || Benitez (12) || Coors Field || 25,433 || 17–21
|- bgcolor="ffcccc"
| 39 || May 13 || @ Rockies || 8–9 || Reed (3–1) || Cerda (0–1) ||  Jimenez (9) || Coors Field || 25,043 || 17–22
|- bgcolor="ffcccc"
| 40 || May 14 || @ Rockies || 5–6 || Reed (4–1) || Stanton (2–3) ||  Jimenez (10) || Coors Field || 26,755 || 17–23
|- bgcolor="ffcccc"
| 41 || May 15 || @ Giants || 3–11 || Rueter (4–1) || Leiter (4–2) || — || SBC Park || 36,542 || 17–24
|- bgcolor="ffcccc"
| 42 || May 16 || @ Giants || 5–7 || Nathan (5–1) || Weathers (1–3) || Worrell (12) || SBC Park || 39,160 || 17–25
|- bgcolor="ccffcc"
| 43 || May 17 || @ Giants || 5–1 || Trachsel (2–2) || Moss (5–2) || — || SBC Park || 42,259 || 18–25
|- bgcolor="ccffcc"
| 44 || May 18 || @ Giants || 5–1 || Glavine (5–3) || Ainsworth (3–4) || — || SBC Park || 42,590 || 19–25
|- bgcolor="ffcccc"
| 45 || May 20 || Phillies || 7–11 || Myers (4–3) || Lloyd (1–1) || — || Shea Stadium || 25,281 || 19–26
|- bgcolor="ccffcc"
| 46 || May 21 || Phillies || 5–4 || Benitez (1–3) || Adams (0–2) || — || Shea Stadium || 29,551 || 20–26
|- bgcolor="ccffcc"
| 47 || May 22 || Phillies || 6–3 || Astacio (3–1) || Padilla (3–6) || Benitez (13) || Shea Stadium || 20,101 || 21–26
|- bgcolor="ccffcc"
| 48 || May 23 || @ Braves || 6–5 || Trachsel (3–2) || Ortiz (6–3) || Benitez (14) || Turner Field || 33,270 || 22–26
|- bgcolor="ffcccc"
| 49 || May 24 || @ Braves || 4–10 || Ramirez (4–2) || Glavine (5–4) || — || Turner Field || 40,912 || 22–27
|- bgcolor="ffcccc"
| 50 || May 25 || @ Braves || 1–3 || Hernandez (4–1) || Weathers (1–4) || Smoltz (19) || Turner Field || 41,432 || 22–28
|- bgcolor="ccffcc"
| 51 || May 27 || @ Phillies || 4–2 || Leiter (5–2) || Wolf (5–3) || Benitez (15) || Veterans Stadium || 18,081 || 23–28
|- bgcolor="ffcccc"
| 52 || May 28 || @ Phillies || 3–11 || Padilla (4–6) || Astacio (3–2) || — || Veterans Stadium || 21,389 || 23–29
|- bgcolor="ccffcc"
| 53 || May 29 || @ Phillies || 5–0 || Trachsel (4–2) || Millwood (7–2) || — || Veterans Stadium || 19,568 || 24–29
|- bgcolor="ffcccc"
| 54 || May 30 || Braves || 2–5 || Maddux (4–5) || Glavine (5–5) || Smoltz (20) || Shea Stadium || 26,439 || 24–30
|- bgcolor="ccffcc"
| 55 || May 31 || Braves || 4–2 || Seo (2–2) || Hampton (2–3) ||Benitez (16) || Shea Stadium || 33,378 || 25–30
|-

|- bgcolor="ccffcc"
| 56 || June 1 || Braves || 10–4 || Leiter (6–2) || Gryboski (3–3) || — || Shea Stadium || 25,162 || 26–30
|- bgcolor="#cccccc"
| – || June 3 || Brewers || colspan=8|Postponed (rain); rescheduled for June 5
|- bgcolor="#cccccc"
| – || June 4 || Brewers || colspan=8|Postponed (rain); rescheduled for July 28
|- bgcolor="ffcccc"
| 57 || June 5  || Brewers || 7–8 || Kinney (4–4) || Trachsel (4–3) || DeJean (13) || Shea Stadium || N/A || 26–31
|- bgcolor="ffcccc"
| 58 || June 5  || Brewers || 3–5 || Sheets (6–4) || Glavine (5–6) || DeJean (14) || Shea Stadium || 19,048 || 26–32
|- bgcolor="ccffcc"
| 59 || June 6 || Mariners || 3–2 || Seo (3–2) || Franklyn (4–4) || Benitez (17) || Shea Stadium || 26,684 || 27–32
|- bgcolor="#ccc"
| – || June 7 || Mariners || colspan=8|Postponed (rain); rescheduled for June 8
|- bgcolor="ffcccc"
| 60 || June 8  || Mariners || 1–13 || Garcia (6–6) || Leiter (6–3) || — || Shea Stadium || N/A || 27–33
|- bgcolor="ffcccc"
| 61 || June 8  || Mariners || 0–7 || Moyer (10–2) || Bacsik (0–1) || — || Shea Stadium || 39,820 || 27–34
|- bgcolor="ffcccc"
| 62 || June 10 || @ Rangers || 7–9 || Thomson (4–7) || Trachsel (4–4) || Urbina (18) || The Ballpark in Arlington || 20,581 || 27–35
|- bgcolor="ccffcc"
| 63 || June 11 || @ Rangers || 8–2 || Seo (4–2) || Santos (0–1) || — || The Ballpark in Arlington || 19,087 || 28–35
|- bgcolor="ccffcc"
| 64 || June 12 || @ Rangers || 11–0 || Leiter (7–3) || Lewis (4–5) || — || The Ballpark in Arlington || 19,044 || 29–35
|- bgcolor="ccffcc"
| 65 || June 13 || @ Angels || 7–3 || Bacsik (1–1) || Sele (3–4) || — || Edison International Field of Anaheim || 38,294 || 30–35 
|- bgcolor="ffcccc"
| 66 || June 14 || @ Angels || 3–13 || Ortiz (7–5) || Roach (0–1) || — || Edison International Field of Anaheim || 43,449 || 30–36
|- bgcolor="ccffcc"
| 67 || June 15 || @ Angels || 8–0 || Trachsel (5–4) || Washburn (6–7) || — || Edison International Field of Anaheim || 43,721 || 31–36
|- bgcolor="ffcccc"
| 68 || June 16 || @ Marlins || 0–1 || Willis (6–1) || Glavine (5–7) || — || Pro Player Stadium || 10,624 || 31–37
|- bgcolor="ccffcc"
| 69 || June 17 || @ Marlins || 5–0 || Seo (5–2) || Pavano (5–8) || — || Pro Player Stadium || 10,359 || 32–37
|- bgcolor="ccffcc"
| 70 || June 18 || @ Marlins || 10–5 || Leiter (8–3) || Penny (5–5) || Wheeler (1) || Pro Player Stadium || 11,326 || 33–37
|- bgcolor="ffcccc"
| 71 || June 19 || @ Marlins || 1–5 || Phelps (3–2) || Bacsik (1–2) || — || Pro Player Stadium || 10,400 || 33–38
|- bgcolor="ffcccc"
| 72 || June 20 || Yankees || 0–5 || Pettitte (7–6) || Trachsel (5–5) || — || Shea Stadium || 55,386 || 33–39
|- bgcolor="cccccc"
| – || June 21 || Yankees || colspan=8|Postponed (rain); rescheduled for June 28
|- bgcolor="ffcccc"
| 73 || June 22 || Yankees || 3–7  || Rivera (2–0) || Lloyd (1–2) || — || Shea Stadium || 55,031 || 33–40
|- bgcolor="ffcccc"
| 74 || June 24 || Marlins || 4–8 || Penny (6–5) || Leiter (8–4) || Tejera (1) || Shea Stadium || 22,226 || 33–41 
|- bgcolor="ccffcc"
| 75 || June 25 || Marlins || 6–3 || Trachsel (6–5) || Redman (5–3) || Benitez (18) || Shea Stadium || 22,563 || 34–41 
|- bgcolor="ffcccc"
| 76 || June 26 || Marlins || 1–6 || Willis (8–1) || Heilman (0–1) || — || Shea Stadium || 30,378 || 34–42 
|- bgcolor="ffcccc"
| 77 || June 27 || @ Yankees || 4–6 || Wells (10–2) || Seo (5–3) || Miceli (1) || Yankee Stadium || 55,226 || 34–43
|- bgcolor="ffcccc"
| 78 || June 28  || @ Yankees || 1–7 || Clemens (8–5) || Griffiths (0–1) || — || Yankee Stadium || 55,343 || 34–44
|- bgcolor="ffcccc"
| 79 || June 28  || Yankees || 8–9 || Claussen (1–0) || Glavine (5–8) || Rivera (13) || Shea Stadium || 36,372 || 34–45
|- bgcolor="ffcccc"
| 80 || June 29 || @ Yankees || 3–5 || Weaver (4–6) || Leiter (8–5) || Rivera (14) || Yankee Stadium || 55,444 || 34–46
|- bgcolor="ccffcc"
| 81 || June 30 || Expos || 3–1 || Trachsel (7–5) || Vazquez (6–6) || Benitez (19) || Shea Stadium || 29,829 || 35–46
|-

 
|- bgcolor="ccffcc"
| 82 || July 1 || Expos || 7–6 || Benitez (2–3) || Manon (0–2) || — || Shea Stadium || 30,084 || 36–46
|- bgcolor="ffcccc"
| 83 || July 2 || Expos || 4–11 || Hernandez (7–6) || Seo (5–4) || — || Shea Stadium || 35,547 || 36–47
|- bgcolor="ccffcc"
| 84 || July 4 || @ Reds || 7–2 || Glavine (6–8) || Haynes (1–8) || Benitez (20) || Great American Ball Park || 35,511 || 37–47
|- bgcolor="ccffcc" 
| 85 || July 5 || @ Reds || 6–2 || Trachsel (8–5) || Graves (4–8) || Weathers (1) || Great American Ball Park || 41,020 || 38–47
|- bgcolor="ccffcc"
| 86 || July 6 || @ Reds || 7–5 || Cerda (1–1) || Reith (1–1) || Benitez (21) || Great American Ball Park || 31,054 || 39–47
|- bgcolor="ffcccc"
| 87 || July 7 || Braves || 3–7 || Ramirez (8–2) || Seo (5–5) || — || Shea Stadium || 32,399 || 39–48
|- bgcolor="ffcccc"
| 88 || July 8 || Braves || 3–5 || Reynolds (6–4) || Roach (0–2) || Smoltz (33) || Shea Stadium || 29,096 || 39–49
|- bgcolor="ffcccc"
| 89 || July 9 || Braves || 3–6 || Ortiz (12–4) || Glavine (6–9) || Smoltz (34) || Shea Stadium || 30,308 || 39–50
|- bgcolor="ffcccc"
| 90 || July 10 || Phillies || 2–7 || Padilla (8–8) || Trachsel (8–6) || — || Shea Stadium || 25,913 || 39–51
|- bgcolor="ffcccc"
| 91 || July 11 || Phillies || 3–10 || Wolf (10–4) || Heilman (0–2) || — || Shea Stadium || 35,884 || 39–52
|- bgcolor="ffcccc"
| 92 || July 12 || Phillies || 2–4  || Mesa (4–5) || Franco (0–1) || — || Shea Stadium || 33,452 || 39–53
|- bgcolor="ccffcc"
| 93 || July 13 || Phillies || 4–3 || Benitez (3–3) || Adams (1–3) || — || Shea Stadium || 31,630 || 40–53
|- bgcolor="bbcaff" 
| colspan=10 | 74th All-Star Game in Chicago, Illinois
|- bgcolor="ffcccc"
| 94 || July 17 || @ Braves || 2–3 || Maddux (8–8) || Franco (0–2) || — || Turner Field || 36,688 || 40–54
|- bgcolor="ffcccc"
| 95 || July 18 || @ Braves || 4–11 || Hampton (6–5) || Seo (5–6) || — || Turner Field || 44,815 || 40–55
|- bgcolor="ffcccc"
| 96 || July 19 || @ Braves || 4–7 || Ortiz (13–4) || Glavine (6–10) || Smoltz (35) || Turner Field || 45,759 || 40–56
|- bgcolor="ffcccc"
| 97 || July 20 || @ Braves || 8–11 || King (3–0) || Stanton (2–4) || Smoltz (36) || Turner Field || 36,029 || 40–57
|- bgcolor="ccffcc"
| 98 || July 21 || @ Phillies || 8–6 || Heilman (1–2) || Duckworth (3–4) || Franco (1) || Veterans Stadium || 33,208 || 41–57
|- bgcolor="ccffcc"
| 99 || July 22 || @ Phillies || 7–5 || Trachsel (9–6) || Millwood (10–7) || Wheeler (2) || Veterans Stadium || 37,164 || 42–57
|- bgcolor="ffcccc"
| 100 || July 23 || @ Expos || 2–5 || Vazquez (8–6) || Seo (5–7) || Biddle (23) || Olympic Stadium || 8,853 || 42–58
|- bgcolor="ffcccc"
| 101 || July 24 || @ Expos || 1–5 || Hernandez (10–6) || Glavine (6–11) || Biddle (24) || Olympic Stadium || 9,337 || 42–59
|- bgcolor="ccffcc"
| 102 || July 25 || Reds || 3–1 || Leiter (9–5) || Graves (4–11) || Stanton (1) || Shea Stadium || 34,021 || 43–59
|- bgcolor="ffcccc"
| 103 || July 26 || Reds || 3–8 || Acevedo (2–0) || Heilman (1–3) || — || Shea Stadium || 29,305 || 43–60
|- bgcolor="ffcccc"
| 104 || July 27 || Reds || 5–8 || Wilson (6–8) || Trachsel (9–7) || Williamson (21) || Shea Stadium || 30,173 || 43–61
|- bgcolor="ffcccc"
| 105 || July 28 || Brewers || 2–4 || Estrella (3–2) || Weathers (1–5) || Kolb (3) || Shea Stadium || 6,056 || 43–62
|- bgcolor="ffcccc"
| 106 || July 29 || Brewers || 3–6 || Sheets (10–7) || Wheeler (0–1) || DeJean (18) || Shea Stadium || 22,846 || 43–63
|- bgcolor="ccffcc"
| 107 || July 30 || Brewers || 2–0 || Leiter (10–5) || Obermueller (0–2) || Weathers (2) || Shea Stadium || 22,389 || 44–63
|- bgcolor="ffcccc"
| 108 || July 31 || Brewers || 3–4 || Kinney (7–8) || Heilman (1–4) || Kolb (4) || Shea Stadium || 27,590 || 44–64
|-

|- bgcolor="ffcccc"
| 109 || August 1 || Cardinals || 2–8 || Kline (4–4) || Wheeler (0–2) || — || Shea Stadium || 23,578 || 44–65
|- bgcolor="ffcccc"
| 110 || August 2 || Cardinals || 9–10 || Tomko (7–7) || Seo (5–8) || Yan (1) || Shea Stadium || 30,898 || 44–66
|- bgcolor="ccffcc"
| 111 || August 3 || Cardinals || 13–5 || Griffiths (1–1) || Stephenson (5–11) || — || Shea Stadium || 27,592 || 45–66
|- bgcolor="ccffcc"
| 112 || August 5 || @ Astros || 10–1 || Leiter (11–5) || Villone (3–2) || — || Minute Maid Park || 31,582 || 46–66
|- bgcolor="ffcccc"
| 113 || August 6 || @ Astros || 1–11 || Miller (8–10) || Heilman (1–5) || — || Minute Maid Park || 30,154 || 46–67
|- bgcolor="ccffcc"
| 114 || August 7 || @ Astros || 5–4 || Trachsel (10–7) || Lidge (4–2) || Stanton (2) || Minute Maid Park || 31,250 || 47–67
|- bgcolor="ccffcc"
| 115 || August 8 || @ Diamondbacks || 3–1 || Glavine (7–11) || Webb (7–5) || Stanton (3) || Bank One Ballpark || 36,335 || 48–67
|- bgcolor="ffcccc"
| 116 || August 9 || @ Diamondbacks || 1–2 || Randolph (6–0) || Franco (0–3) || — || Bank One Ballpark || 41,934 || 48–68
|- bgcolor="ffcccc"
| 117 || August 10 || @ Diamondbacks || 4–7 || Johnson (3–4) || Leiter (11–6) || Mantei (15) || Bank One Ballpark || 37,521 || 48–69
|- bgcolor="ccffcc"
| 118 || August 12 || Giants || 5–4 || Heilman (2–5) || Ponson (14–8) || Weathers (3) || Shea Stadium || 37,461 || 49–69
|- bgcolor="ccffcc"
| 119 || August 13 || Giants || 9–2 || Trachsel (11–7) || Williams (5–3) || — || Shea Stadium || 31,759 || 50–69
|- bgcolor="cccccc"
| – || August 14 || Giants || colspan=8|Cancelled (power outage)
|- bgcolor="ccffcc"
| 120 || August 15 || Rockies || 5–0 || Glavine (8–11) || Oliver (10–8) || — || Shea Stadium || 28,081 || 51–69
|- bgcolor="ccffcc"
| 121 || August 16 || Rockies || 13–4 || Seo (6–8) || Chacon (11–8) || — || Shea Stadium || 28,233 || 52–69
|- bgcolor="ccffcc"
| 122 || August 17 || Rockies || 6–4 || Leiter (12–6) || Jennings (10–11) || Weathers (4) || Shea Stadium || 28,393 || 53–69
|- bgcolor="ccffcc"
| 123 || August 18 || Rockies || 8–0 || Trachsel (12–7) || Tsao (2–1) || — || Shea Stadium || 23,865 || 54–69
|- bgcolor="ffcccc"
| 124 || August 19 || @ Padres || 2–3 || Limebrink (2–2) || Stanton (2–5) || Beck (17) || Qualcomm Stadium || 21,794 || 54–70
|- bgcolor="ffcccc"
| 125 || August 20 || @ Padres || 1–2 || Beck (3–1) || Roberts (0–1) || — || Qualcomm Stadium || 16,532 || 54–71
|- bgcolor="ccffcc"
| 126 || August 21 || @ Padres || 5–1 || Seo (7–8) || Perez (4–7) || — || Qualcomm Stadium || 21,958 || 55–71
|- bgcolor="ffcccc"
| 127 || August 22 || @ Dodgers || 1–2 || Nomo (15–9) || Leiter (12–7) || Gagne (43) || Dodger Stadium || 40,714 || 55–72
|- bgcolor="ccffcc"
| 128 || August 23 || @ Dodgers || 4–0 || Trachsel (13–7) || Ashby (3–10) || — || Dodger Stadium || 44,449 || 56–72
|- bgcolor="ccffcc"
| 129 || August 24 || @ Dodgers || 2–1 || Glavine (9–11) || Brown (12–7) || Franco (2) || Dodger Stadium || 45,496 || 57–72
|- bgcolor="ccffcc"
| 130 || August 26 || @ Braves || 6–5 || Seo (8–8) || Reynolds (10–7) || Stanton (4) || Turner Field || 24,694 || 58–72
|- bgcolor="ffcccc"
| 131 || August 27 || @ Braves || 1–4 || Maddux (13–10) || Heilman (2–6) || Mercker (1) || Turner Field || 23,755 || 58–73
|- bgcolor="ccffcc"
| 132 || August 28 || @ Braves || 3–1 || Leiter (13–7) || Hampton (12–6) || Weathers (5) || Turner Field || 27,856 || 59–73
|- bgcolor="ffcccc"
| 133 || August 29 || Phillies || 0–7 || Millwood (13–9) || Trachsel (13–8) || — || Shea Stadium || 33,208 || 59–74
|- bgcolor="ffcccc"
| 134 || August 30 || Phillies || 2–4 || Wolf (13–9) || Glavine (9–12) || Mesa (23) || Shea Stadium || 26,769 || 59–75
|- bgcolor="ffcccc"
| 135 || August 31 || Phillies || 1–4 || Padilla (12–9) || Seo (8–9) || Mesa (24) || Shea Stadium || 26,180 || 59–76
|-

|- bgcolor="ccffcc"
| 136 || September 1 || Braves || 3–2 || Wheeler (1–2) || Hodges (3–3) || Weathers (6) || Shea Stadium || 23,877 || 60–76
|- bgcolor="ccffcc"
| 137 || September 2 || Braves || 3–1 || Leiter (14–7) || Hampton (12–7) || Weathers (7) || Shea Stadium || 24,390 || 61–76
|- bgcolor="ccffcc"
| 138 || September 3 || Braves || 9–3 || Trachsel (14–8) || Ortiz (18–6) || — || Shea Stadium || 16,439 || 62–76
|- bgcolor="ffcccc"
| 139 || September 4 || @ Phillies || 5–6 || de los Santos (4–3) || Stanton (2–6) || — || Veterans Stadium || 19,259 || 62–77
|- bgcolor="ffcccc"
| 140 || September 5 || @ Phillies || 0–1 || Padilla (13–9) || Seo (8–10) || Cormier (1) || Veterans Stadium || 26,712 || 62–78
|- bgcolor="ffcccc"
| 141 || September 6 || @ Phillies || 6–9 || Myers (13–7) || Griffiths (1–2) || Wendell (1) || Veterans Stadium || 38,671 || 62–79
|- bgcolor="ffcccc"
| 142 || September 7 || @ Phillies || 4–5  || Cormier (6–0) || Wheeler (1–3) || — || Veterans Stadium || 29,159 || 62–80
|- bgcolor="ffcccc"
| 143 || September 8 || Marlins || 0–5 || Beckett (8–7) || Trachsel (14–9) || — || Shea Stadium || 15,155 || 62–81
|- bgcolor="ffcccc"
| 144 || September 9 || Marlins || 1–3 || Urbina (3–4) || Weathers (1–6) || Looper (28) || Shea Stadium || 29,410 || 62–82
|- bgcolor="ffcccc"
| 145 || September 10 || Marlins || 3–7 || Redman (12–9) || Seo (8–11) || — || Shea Stadium || 16,699 || 62–83
|- bgcolor="ffcccc"
| 146 || September 12 || @ Expos || 4–7 || Tucker (1–2) || Leiter (14–8) || Ayala (5) || Olympic Stadium || 10,701 || 62–84
|- bgcolor="ccffcc"
| 147 || September 13 || @ Expos || 5–4 || Trachsel (15–9) || Vazquez (12–11) || Roberts (1) || Olympic Stadium || 15,086 || 63–84
|- bgcolor="ffcccc"
| 148 || September 14 || @ Expos || 3–7 || Day (8–7) || Glavine (9–13) || — || Olympic Stadium || 21,417 || 63–85
|- bgcolor="ffcccc"
| 149 || September 15 || @ Cubs || 1–4 || Clement (13–11) || Griffiths (1–3) || Borowski (29) || Wrigley Field || 38,698 || 63–86
|- bgcolor="ffcccc"
| 150 || September 16 || @ Cubs || 2–3 || Prior (16–6) || Seo (8–12) || Borowski (30) || Wrigley Field || 39,534 || 63–87
|- bgcolor="ffcccc"
| 151 || September 17 || @ Cubs || 0–2 || Wood (13–11) || Leiter (14–9) || — || Wrigley Field || 38,482 || 63–88
|- bgcolor="ffcccc"
| 152 || September 18 || Expos || 0–1 || Vazquez (13–11) || Trachsel (15–10) || Cordero (1) || Shea Stadium || 18,914 || 63–89
|- bgcolor="ffcccc"
| 153 || September 19 || Expos || 1–7 || Day (9–7) || Glavine (9–14) || — || Shea Stadium || 33,083 || 63–90
|- bgcolor="ffcccc"
| 154 || September 20 || Expos || 3–4  || Cordero (1–0) || Stanton (2–7) || Biddle (32) || Shea Stadium || 37,294 || 63–91
|- bgcolor="ffcccc"
| 155 || September 21 || Expos || 2–4 || Ayala (10–3) || Roberts (0–2) || Biddle (33) || Shea Stadium || 28,702 || 63–92
|- bgcolor="ccffcc"
| 156 || September 23 || Pirates || 1–0 || Leiter (15–9) || Wells (9–9) || — || Shea Stadium || 17,830 || 64–92
|- bgcolor="ccffcc"
| 157 || September 24 || Pirates || 5–3 || Trachsel (16–10) || D'Amico (9–16) || Stanton (5) || Shea Stadium || 22,134 || 65–92
|- bgcolor="ffcccc"
| 158 || September 25 || Pirates || 1–3 || Torres (7–5) || Roberts (0–3) || Tavarez (10) || Shea Stadium || 25,081 || 65–93
|- bgcolor="ffcccc"
| 159 || September 26 || @ Marlins || 3–4 || Pavano (12–13) || Heilman (2–7) || Urbina (32) || Pro Player Stadium || 33,215 || 65–94
|- bgcolor="ccffcc"
| 160 || September 27 || @ Marlins || 9–3 || Seo (9–11) || Tejera (3–4) || — || Pro Player Stadium || 30,204 || 66–94
|- bgcolor="ffcccc"
| 161 || September 28 || @ Marlins || 0–4 || Willis (14–6) || Griffiths' (1–4) || — || Pro Player Stadium || 27,529 || 66–95
|-

Roster

Player stats

Batting

Starters by positionNote: Pos = Position; G = Games played; AB = At bats; H = Hits; Avg. = Batting average; HR = Home runs; RBI = Runs batted inOther battersNote: G = Games played; AB = At bats; H = Hits; Avg. = Batting average; HR = Home runs; RBI = Runs batted inPitching

Starting pitchersNote: G = Games pitched; IP = Innings pitched; W = Wins; L = Losses; ERA = Earned run average; SO = StrikeoutsOther pitchersNote: G = Games pitched; IP = Innings pitched; W = Wins; L = Losses; ERA = Earned run average; SO = StrikeoutsRelief pitchersNote: G = Games pitched; W = Wins; L = Losses; SV = Saves; ERA = Earned run average; SO = Strikeouts''

Farm system

LEAGUE CHAMPIONS: St. Lucie

References

External links
2003 New York Mets at Baseball Reference
2003 New York Mets team page at www.baseball-almanac.com

New York Mets seasons
New York Mets
New York Mets
2000s in Queens